The 1869 City of Dunedin by-election was a by-election held  on 5 March 1869 in the  electorate in Dunedin during the 4th New Zealand Parliament.

The by-election was caused by the resignation of the incumbent, James Paterson.

The winner was Thomas Birch. He was opposed by James Gordon Stuart Grant, a local eccentric and frequent candidate.

Results

References 

 

By-elections in New Zealand
1869 elections in New Zealand
March 1869 events
Politics of Dunedin
1860s in Dunedin